Levi's Stadium is an American football stadium located in Santa Clara, California, just west of the much larger city of San Jose, in the San Francisco Bay Area. It has served as the home venue for the National Football League (NFL)'s San Francisco 49ers since 2014. It is named after Levi Strauss & Co., which purchased naming rights in 2013.

In 2006, the 49ers proposed constructing a new stadium at Candlestick Point in San Francisco, the site of their erstwhile home, Candlestick Park. The project, which included plans for retail space and housing improvements, was claimed to be of great potential benefit to the nearby historically blighted neighborhood of Hunters Point. After negotiations with the city of San Francisco fell through, the 49ers focused their attention on a site adjacent to their administrative offices and training facility in Santa Clara.

In June 2010, Santa Clara voters approved a measure authorizing the creation of the tax-exempt Santa Clara Stadium Authority to build and own the new football stadium and for the city to lease land to the authority. A construction loan raised from private investors was secured in December 2011, allowing construction to start in April 2012. Levi's Stadium opened on July 17, 2014.

Levi's Stadium was the site of the Pac-12 Football Championship Game from 2014 through 2019 before moving to Allegiant Stadium in Las Vegas. Previously, that game was played on the home field of the division winner possessing the better record. Levi's Stadium hosted Super Bowl 50 on February 7, 2016  and also hosted the 2019 College Football Playoff National Championship. Levi's Stadium will host multiple matches during the 2026 FIFA World Cup.

Stadium design
The stadium was designed by HNTB, an internationally renowned architectural firm, with a focus on creating a multi-purpose venue and with the fan experience and green technology as top priorities. Civil engineering work was performed by Winzler & Kelly, which was acquired by GHD Group in 2011. Commissioning services were provided by Glumac.

Basic stadium features

Levi's Stadium is designed as an open stadium with a natural grass field. It has a seating capacity of 68,500, expandable to approximately 75,000 to host major events like the Super Bowl and the FIFA World Cup. However, on June 27, 2015, The Grateful Dead Fare Thee Well Tour made history by extending the stadium to 83,000 in attendance. The seating design of the stadium places approximately two-thirds of the fans in the lower bowl, which is one of the largest of its kind in the entire NFL. The design features significantly improved accessibility and seating options for fans with special needs and disabilities when compared to the 49ers former home, the now-demolished Candlestick Park. The configuration is similar to Ford Field, home of the NFL's Detroit Lions, with the majority of the luxury suites on one side of the field, which puts the fans in the upper deck closer to the action.

As a multi-use facility, the stadium can be configured for special touring events including concerts, motocross events, indoor/outdoor conferences, and other community events. The stadium is also designed to meet the FIFA field geometry requirements for international soccer, which will allow it to host international friendly matches and major tournaments such as the FIFA World Cup.

Stadium app
The stadium has created an in stadium app designed specifically for home football games for the 49ers to provide a better fan experience for fans and guests. The app can be downloaded for free from the App Store and Google Play. Features are limited on non-football game days or if one is outside the vicinity of the stadium. However, when having the app within the stadium on game and event days one has many options including in-seat delivery, live streaming, navigation and much more. The app can be extended to other events hosted by the stadium if the third party would like to include its features for their guests.

Issues with the turf
The stadium had repeated problems with the grass surface, including the grass collapsing under Baltimore Ravens kicker Justin Tucker during a week 6 game in 2015. This led to concern that the stadium wasn't of a high enough caliber to host a high stakes game such as the Super Bowl. The problems with the turf were mentioned the day after the Super Bowl by Denver Broncos cornerback Aqib Talib who said "The footing on the field was terrible. San Fran (the 49ers) has to play eight games on that field, so they better do something to get it fixed. It was terrible."

Environmental sustainability
Stadium proponents claim that the stadium is currently one of the largest buildings registered with the U.S. Green Building Council. It is also believed to be the first stadium that will have both a green roof and solar panels. The 49ers are exploring collaborative opportunities with the Environmental Protection Agency to explore environmentally friendly components including:

 Use of an outside commissioning agent to verify that energy‐related systems are installed, calibrated, and performing in compliance with the project requirements
 Use of public transit nearby including VTA, ACE, Amtrak, with connection to a proposed future BART extension
 Construction of a green roof (27,000± sf) and photovoltaic panels (20,000± sf)
 Use of paving materials and roofing materials with a high solar reflectance index
 Use of recycled water for landscape irrigation, toilets, and urinals along with water‐conserving fixtures
 No use of CFC‐based refrigerants in the HVAC systems. Systems will instead use refrigerants that minimize compounds that contribute to ozone depletion
 Installation of permanent monitoring systems that provide feedback on ventilation system performance
 Diversion, recycling, and/or salvaging 75% of non‐hazardous construction waste
 Use of controllable and programmable lighting control systems and thermal comfort control systems

Levi's Stadium received a Gold LEED (Leadership in Energy and Environmental Design) Certificate. It is the first professional football stadium in the United States to receive this certification as new construction.

Rooftop farm
In July 2016, Levi's Stadium converted  of the green roof to an organically maintained rooftop farm. The vision for this quarter-acre—named the Faithful Farm after the 49ers' loyal following—came from team CEO Jed York and his wife. Danielle York, a former science teacher, was particularly interested in a dedicated space that could help the building achieve some of its goals for sustainability. The first rooftop farm on an NFL stadium, Lara Hermanson and Matt Sandoval of Farmscape worked with the San Francisco 49ers to create the Faithful Farm. Herbs, tomatoes, peppers, zucchini, leafy greens and edible flowers are among the 40 rotational crops which are harvested for use in dishes served at Levi's Stadium in club spaces during games and at the more than 200 private events hosted at the stadium each year.  the farm was undergoing expansion to add another .

Transportation

Public transit
Stadium patrons have the option of riding VTA Light Rail (Valley Transportation Authority) to the stadium. The closest light rail station is the Great America station, which is located just west of the stadium in the median of Tasman Drive.

To the east, other transit options include the VTA Lick Mill station (also in the Tasman median) as well as the Amtrak and ACE station near California's Great America. VTA also offers dedicated shuttle bus service to the stadium from the Warm Springs BART station.

Nearby transit stations

Walking and bicycling

Levi's Stadium was constructed immediately east of the San Tomas Aquino Trail, a paved multi-use path installed by the City of Santa Clara in 2004 that connects to a continuous  network of off-street paths including the regional San Francisco Bay Trail. The city announced in March 2013 that the San Tomas Aquino Trail would be "temporarily detoured between Agnew Road and Tasman Drive for approximately one year starting April 15 and ending when the Stadium is open," but this one-mile section of the trail remained closed to the public before and during stadium events since they began in August 2014, requiring the continued use of the two-mile on-street detour.

The stadium project's Final Environmental Impact Report (EIR) disclosed no such ongoing temporary closures of the trail, but stated instead that "While there will likely be a sizeable increase in pedestrians on the San Tomas Aquino Creek trail before and after NFL events, the creek trail is open to both pedestrians and cyclists and there are no restrictions on use. Anyone at anytime can access and use the trail."

Vehicular access
The stadium's official mailing address is on Marie P DeBartolo Way (formerly Centennial Boulevard), which is actually a cul-de-sac on the east side of the stadium. The primary access route to the stadium is Tasman Drive, which runs along its northern side. Tasman is a major east–west arterial road which connects to Interstate 880 several miles to the east. Both west and east of the stadium, Tasman intersects with various north–south arterial roads which connect to several important freeways, such as California State Route 87, U.S. Route 101, California State Route 237, and Interstate 680. The closest and most important of those north–south roads is Great America Parkway to the west of the stadium, which is named after the theme park to the south.

Naming rights
On May 8, 2013, the 49ers announced that San Francisco-based Levi Strauss & Co. purchased the naming rights to the new stadium. The deal calls for Levi's to pay $220.3 million to the city of Santa Clara and the 49ers over 20 years, with an option to extend the deal for another five years for around $75 million. On September 14, 2015, ESPN's Chris Berman coined the name "The Big Bellbottom" in reference to the stadium. In a Deadspin article covering the 49ers on August 18, 2015, article writer Drew Magary coined the nickname "the Jeanhole" for the stadium.

Reception
Levi's Stadium has been praised for its excellent sightlines, beautiful architecture, plentiful amenities, technological advancements, convenient public transportation access, and environmental sustenance. However, the stadium has been heavily criticized for its highly corporate atmosphere and lack of a football atmosphere that Candlestick Park had. With the stadium having the most expensive ticket prices in the league during its inaugural season, many long-tenured and loyal fans that had contributed to the football atmosphere at Candlestick Park could not afford to buy season tickets with the added cost of the Stadium Builders License. Additionally, with the distractions inside the stadium that include multiple bars and lounges, fans would often hang out in those places while the game is going on rather than watching the game from their seats.

Levi's Stadium has received some backlash from season ticket holders, who are unhappy regarding rules that won't allow them to print their tickets until 72 hours before the game, making re-sale very difficult. In addition, older 49ers fans say that people are more segmented at Levi's Stadium in comparison to Candlestick Park, leaving tailgaters with large expanses of empty parking stalls and a more desolate tailgating experience.

Pilots flying into San Jose International Airport have frequently complained of being blinded or disoriented by the lights from the light towers and scoreboards. The stadium is directly in the flight path of one of the airport's runways. According to Bay Area NBC affiliate KNTV in 2016, there had been at least 43 complaints about the lights since the stadium opened.

Levi's Stadium has also received heavy criticism for the way fans are treated on hot days during early-season afternoon games. The majority of fans are seated on the east side of the stadium and during these afternoon games, this side of the stadium is fully exposed to the elements due to the lack of overhangs. With the climate of Santa Clara being much warmer than San Francisco, it makes watching games on hot days uncomfortable for fans as they are less accommodated for exposure to the sun than are patrons at other stadiums in hot-weather climates. Several fans suffered heat exhaustion during preseason and early season afternoon games. This has led to the eastern stands being largely empty on hot days. The stadium had been designed with the Candlestick Point site in mind and when the team decided to build it in Santa Clara instead, they kept the design intact in order to quickly get started on construction without taking the differences in climate into account. Due to its close proximity to the airport, Federal Aviation Administration regulations do not allow the 49ers to add any more height to the stadium, while any additional overhangs would have to be structures, making it very difficult to fix the problem.

Previous plans
The 49ers pursued a new stadium since 1997, when a plan for a stadium and a mall at Candlestick Point passed a public vote. When the plans failed to move forward, the San Francisco 49ers presented an alternative plan on July 18, 2006, to construct a new 68,500-seat, open air stadium as part of a mixed use development featuring housing, commercial and retail space. In November 2006 the team announced that plans for a new stadium at Candlestick Point were not feasible, "citing extensive costs for infrastructure, parking accommodations and other changes that would cost more than the stadium itself". The 49ers turned their focus to making Santa Clara the home to their new stadium.

The 1997 plan
San Francisco voters in 1997 approved $100 million in city spending to build a new stadium and an attached shopping mall at Candlestick Point. However, even after voter approval to grant economic help for the project, the stadium was not constructed. This was because owner Eddie DeBartolo, Jr. was facing legal troubles, which led him to surrender ownership of the team to his sister Denise DeBartolo York and brother-in-law John York. Mills Corporation, the company chosen by the 49ers, was unable to put together a plan to successfully construct a new stadium for the team. NFL owners had gone as far as awarding the new stadium the rights to host Super Bowl XXXVII. When stadium plans stalled, the game went to San Diego's Qualcomm Stadium instead.

For years, the city and team ownership were embattled over attempts to gain funding and a green-light for construction of a new stadium. None of these attempts proved to be successful.

The 2006 plan
The city of San Francisco received a new incentive to get a new stadium built. Mayor Gavin Newsom wanted to bring the 2016 Summer Olympics to the city, and a new stadium would sweeten the city's proposal for selection by the United States Olympic Committee as the official US submission to the IOC. The announcement came in November 2006. It called for a new stadium that would be converted into a 68,600-seat stadium for the 49ers after the Olympics. The Olympic Village would be converted into low-income housing after the games were over.

The new stadium was to be built at Candlestick Point on land just southeast of Candlestick Park. The cost of the stadium would be $916 million. Lennar will build housing, retail, and office space around the stadium area. Originally, part of the area surrounding Candlestick Park was to be zoned for retail space and housing; the new 49ers stadium was to be combined with such elements, bringing much-needed attractions to the historically blighted neighborhood of Hunters Point.

The stadium would be stocked with 150 luxury suites, 7,500 premium club seats, and an increased number of seats lower and closer to the field, called "bowl seating", potentially raising the 49ers franchise value up as much as $250 million and offering at least $300 million in advertising and concession deals, the majority of which from paid corporate naming. The architectural design would be reminiscent of San Francisco buildings.

The project planning did not get off to a good start, however, with contention between the 49ers and the city of San Francisco over viable locations for the new stadium. Initially, the idea was to build a stadium in the parking lot of Candlestick Park and later demolish the aging stadium. Team ownership feared that construction of the village and the stadium would severely limit the amount of land available in Candlestick Point, creating a parking problem for fans and increasing traffic along the roads that link the stadium to the freeway. Moreover, with residents in the low-income housing by 2016, traffic would be permanently increased, further damaging the already-limited methods of transportation to the park.

The sudden removal of the planned stadium forced the San Francisco Olympics bid group to cancel its proposal, which engendered great anger not only from Mayor Newsom, but also from such 49ers legends as Joe Montana and Ronnie Lott, who were part of the effort to bring the Olympics to the Bay Area. In addition, many fans were outraged at the suggestion to move the 49ers out of the city that it had shared history with for decades. The Yorks insisted that the legacy of the franchise would be respected in the sense that the 49ers would not be renamed nor moved out of the Bay Area. This was met with much opposition from Mayor Newsom and Senator Dianne Feinstein (who was mayor of San Francisco between 1978 and 1988); the senator stated that the team should be unable to use the San Francisco name if its operations were not based in the city. On January 3, 2007, California State Senator Carole Migden introduced a bill, entitled SB49, that would bar the 49ers from building a new stadium within a  radius of San Francisco, if they were to leave the city. The 49ers organization announced its strong opposition to the legislation and retorted that passing such a bill would only encourage the team to move out of the Bay Area altogether. The bill died without being acted upon.

Santa Clara City Council Negotiations
The Santa Clara stadium project had been in the works since 2007, with negotiations beginning in 2008. Two years later the following documents were produced that were key to understanding the stadium deal that went before the voters of Santa Clara on June 8, 2010. All documents cited below are publicly available on the City of Santa Clara's website.

 Term sheet: Detailed agreement between the city of Santa Clara and the San Francisco 49ers about the financing, construction, operation, and eventual demolition of the stadium. Key points include: no new or increased city taxes or costs to residents; 49ers responsible for construction and operation cost overruns; and the city will continue to own the land and receive rent payments back to its general fund from the stadium.
 49ers Stadium Proposal: A PowerPoint presentation given to the City of Santa Clara April 24, 2007.
 Study: Economic and Fiscal Impacts of a New State-of-the-Art Stadium in Santa Clara: This is a study conducted by Conventions Sports and Leisure (CSL). It highlights estimates of a new stadium's economic and fiscal impact on the City of Santa Clara and the region including the creation of new jobs and new economic activity.
 Environmental Impact Report: This document is part of the state-mandated California Environmental Quality Act (CEQA) process. It researches in depth all possible environmental impacts the stadium may have.

Most city council members in Santa Clara were extremely receptive to the possibility of a new stadium being constructed there for the 49ers. In 2009, the Santa Clara City Council, led by Mayor Patricia Mahan, along with city employees began negotiating in earnest with the team, who presented the city with stadium plans. On June 2, 2009, by a 5–2 vote, the Santa Clara city council agreed to preliminary terms (as detailed in a term sheet). The official term sheet stated that the team's name would not change; the team would continue to be called the San Francisco 49ers even when the move to Santa Clara was complete.

The campaign

Santa Clara stadium campaign
In December 2009, Cedar Fair Entertainment, Great America's owner, filed a lawsuit to stop the project from proceeding. However, the lawsuit was dismissed in court.

On December 15, 2009, the Santa Clara City Council voted 5–2 to withdraw their city-sponsored ballot measure on the stadium issue in favor of a ballot initiative, Measure J. The ballot initiative was voted on on June 8, 2010 and passed by 58% of Santa Clara voters. Santa Clara City Council members William Kennedy and Jamie McLeod had opposed the stadium project and worked (unsuccessfully) to get Measure J defeated.

Measure J: June 8, 2010
Measure J is a binding, voter-initiated measure that was approved by voters in the City of Santa Clara. All documents cited below are publicly available on the City of Santa Clara's official website.

 Ballot Question: This is the question that was presented to voters:
 Shall the City of Santa Clara adopt Ordinance 17.20 leasing City property for a professional football stadium and other events; no use of City General or Enterprise funds for construction; no new taxes for residents for stadium; Redevelopment Agency funds capped for construction; private party pays all construction cost overruns; no City/Agency obligation for stadium operating/maintenance; private party payment of projected fair market rent; and additional funds for senior/youth/library/recreation to City's General Fund?
 Voter Ordinance: This city ordinance becomes law if Santa Clara voters approve Measure J.

Election results

Oakland Raiders as possible co-tenants
There was a possibility that the Oakland Raiders might share the stadium, allowing its costs to be split between the two teams. The stadium is designed to accommodate two teams, with the exterior LEDs being programmable for alternate colors and two home-team locker rooms. The 49ers and Raiders publicly said it would be an option if possible, while NFL commissioner Roger Goodell was strongly in favor of the two sharing a stadium. Fans of both teams reacted negatively to the idea. The arrangement would have been similar to the New York Giants and New York Jets, who shared Giants Stadium from 1984 to 2009 and currently share its successor, MetLife Stadium.

The 49ers and Raiders sharing a stadium would not have been a first, as the two shared Kezar Stadium for part of 1960. It would have also fulfilled the late Raiders owner Al Davis' goal of a new stadium, something he had strongly desired since the late 1980s although Davis was against sharing a new stadium with another NFL team in Los Angeles when the idea was proposed to him, prompting his move back to Oakland in 1995. 

In the wake of Davis' death, the possibility of the 49ers and Raiders sharing the stadium became a stronger possibility. However, by October 2011, the 49ers were far enough along on the stadium to have reportedly already sold over a quarter of the luxury suites, meaning the Raiders would be forced to be secondary tenants. In October 2012, Oakland Raiders owner Mark Davis told reporters he had no plans to share the Santa Clara stadium with the 49ers. According to the report, discussions remained open, although Davis wanted to keep the team in Oakland, or a nearby site in Dublin.

When the stadium had its grand opening on July 17, 2014, Goodell mentioned to the live crowd that it would make a great home for the Raiders and that it was up for the team to decide whether or not it wanted to play there or build a stadium on the site of the Oakland Coliseum. While the 49ers remained open to sharing the stadium with the Raiders, the Raiders said that their personal preference was the Coliseum site.

On February 20, 2015, the Raiders announced that they would be seeking a joint stadium in Carson, with the San Diego Chargers should they not receive public funding to replace the Oakland Coliseum, reducing the likelihood of the Raiders sharing Levi's Stadium with the 49ers. In January 2016, after losing their bid to relocate to Los Angeles to the Los Angeles Rams, the Raiders withdrew their request to move to Los Angeles, and joint tenancy at Levi's again surfaced in general discussion. However, in March 2017, the Raiders were approved for a move to Las Vegas for the 2020 season, with the new Allegiant Stadium under construction as their future home.

Levi's Stadium was mentioned as a possible temporary home for the Oakland Raiders for the 2019 season before they relocate to Las Vegas. Santa Clara officials drew up plans for this possibility. However, the Raiders signed a one-year lease extension for the Oakland Coliseum, with an option for a second year of construction if Las Vegas were to be delayed, ending any possibility of them playing at Levi's Stadium.

Financing
In December 2011, the Santa Clara City Council voted for an agreement that calls for the city's Stadium Authority to borrow $850 million from Goldman Sachs, Bank of America and U.S. Bank. This will cover most of the construction costs, with the remainder to be made up via funding from the NFL, a hotel tax and city redevelopment funds. Interest, fees and terms for this loan have not been disclosed. The $850 million building loan, plus interest and fees will be assumed by the city's Stadium Authority, where additional interest and fees will be applied.
On February 2, 2012, NFL owners approved a loan to the 49ers of $200 million for use in constructing the new stadium, and to be taken from a new G-4 stadium loan fund. Terms of the loan were not specified, but under the previous G-3 plan, money was repaid directly into the league's account from the borrowing team's share of gate receipts from road games.

Construction

Construction began soon after funding for the stadium had been confirmed. The official groundbreaking took place on April 19, 2012. On July 30, 2012, the first steel beams for the stadium were laid down. The first seats in Levi's Stadium were installed on October 1, 2013.

Construction was halted on June 11, 2013, after a mechanic working on an elevator was struck by a counterweight and then fell down the shaft to his death. Work resumed two days later after officials from the California Occupational Safety and Health Administration (Cal/OSHA) declared the site safe, but as of October 2013, the accident remained under investigation.

The Santa Clara stadium was constructed on a city-owned parking lot on Tasman Drive, located adjacent to the north of California's Great America theme park and leased to Great America for overflow parking. As with Candlestick Park, there are relatively few amenities in the stadium's immediate vicinity for sports fans, besides the 49ers headquarters and training facility. The Santa Clara Convention Center is northwest of the stadium site and there are two hotels on Tasman Drive next to the convention center, but the closest significant concentration of hotels and restaurants is on the Mission College Boulevard corridor almost a mile to the south, on the other side of Great America.

Opening

The stadium opened on July 17, 2014. It was originally scheduled to open on July 11, but was pushed back due to construction delays.
The first game played at the new stadium was a Major League Soccer match on August 2, 2014, where the San Jose Earthquakes defeated Seattle Sounders FC 1–0 before a crowd of 48,765. The inaugural goal was scored in the 42nd minute by Yannick Djaló.

On August 17, 2014, the 49ers lost their first preseason game, 34–0, against the Denver Broncos at Levi's Stadium. One fan at the game collapsed due to the heat and had to be rushed to a local hospital, where he died.

The first 49ers' regular-season game at the stadium was held during Week 2 on September 14, 2014, when the team hosted the Chicago Bears on Sunday Night Football. The Bears won the game 28–20 in front of a 49ers home record attendance of 70,799.

Weekdays and parking
In November 2013, stadium and 49ers' officials initially requested the NFL to not schedule any Monday or Thursday night home games during Levi's Stadium's inaugural season due to parking issues in the area surrounding the stadium during weekdays. Two months later, in January 2014, the Santa Clara city government was able to secure more than the 21,000 necessary parking spots by approving use of the fairways at the city-owned Santa Clara Golf and Tennis Club (which is located to the north of the stadium across Tasman Drive). This arrangement is similar to and was modeled upon a longstanding arrangement between the Rose Bowl in Pasadena and the adjacent Brookside Golf Course, where the golf course was modified to allow for vehicular access to the fairways; they are used for parking only when dry to minimize damage, and any damage that does occur is repaired afterward.

With access to the golf course fairways, Levi's Stadium now had 31,600 potential parking spaces, meaning that tailgating and weeknight games were now a possibility. However, the NFL decided not to schedule any weeknight home games at Levi's Stadium in 2014 until traffic flow within the area is figured out, with the exception of a Thanksgiving game between the 49ers and the Seattle Seahawks on November 27, 2014. Parking prices, which averaged $30 in the 49ers' final season at Candlestick Park, will increase to $40 at Levi's Stadium.

Anticipating significant traffic from Levi's Stadium visitors, the nearby city of Mountain View instituted a three-hour parking limit on downtown streets during game days. While residents received exemptions via permit tags, stadium-goers must park in paid lots or far from Mountain View's Caltrain/VTA light rail station. This station is the closest VTA light rail station to San Francisco and receives transferring passengers heading south to San Jose via light rail (including people using the light rail to go directly to the Levi's Stadium station).

In Spring 2015, 49ers' officials offered the city of Santa Clara $15 million to take over the adjacent Santa Clara Youth Soccer Park and convert these soccer fields into additional parking lots. This money, along with a large percentage of parking fees, would have then been used for the city to build a new youth sports complex elsewhere. The plan was opposed by the youth soccer leagues that use the fields, and critics calling it a "land grab". After many youth soccer players attended a city council meeting on April 29 to protest the proposal, the 49ers withdrew the $15 million offer. The team then gave the city an unsolicited offer of $3 million to help improve various youth athletic fields and facilities, which was cited as a peace offering by San Francisco Chronicle columnists Phil Matier and Andrew Ross, and other Bay Area media, but the city council turned the offer down.

Other events

Super Bowl 50

Super Bowl 50 was held at the stadium on February 7, 2016. The Denver Broncos defeated the Carolina Panthers 24–10. Lady Gaga performed the national anthem, and Coldplay performed with Beyoncé and Bruno Mars at halftime.

WrestleMania 31

Levi's Stadium hosted WWE's WrestleMania 31 on March 29, 2015. This was the first time WrestleMania was hosted in Northern California and the sixth WrestleMania to be held in California. 
The area also hosted various activities in the week-long celebration leading up to WrestleMania itself.

The show set an attendance record for the stadium, with 76,976. It drew a $12.6 million gate.

Ice hockey
Levi's Stadium hosted the 2015 NHL Stadium Series' February 21 game between the Los Angeles Kings and San Jose Sharks. The Kings defeated the Sharks 2–1, in front of a crowd of 70,205.

Concerts

Soccer

On July 31, 2014, the San Jose Earthquakes agreed to play one match per year for five years at Levi's Stadium. On September 6, 2014, an international friendly between Mexico and Chile was held. The stadium also hosted a 2015 International Champions Cup match between Barcelona and Manchester United on July 25, 2015, when United won 3–1. A 2016 International Champions Cup match featured A.C. Milan and Liverpool on July 30, 2016, with Liverpool winning 2–0.

In June 2016, Levi's Stadium hosted four games at the Copa América Centenario; the opening match between United States and Colombia, two other group stage matches, and a quarter-final where Chile defeated Mexico.

A 2017 International Champions Cup game was held on July 23, 2017, when Manchester United defeated Real Madrid 1-1 (2-1 in a penalty shootout).

On July 26, 2017, the United States defeated Jamaica 2–1 to win their sixth CONCACAF Gold Cup title. 
 
On March 23, 2018, Mexico won 3–0 against Iceland in a friendly in both teams' preparation for the 2018 FIFA World Cup.

A 2018 International Champions Cup game was held on August 4, 2018, when AC Milan defeated FC Barcelona 1–0 with a last second goal by André Silva.

On May 12, 2019, the United States women's national soccer team played its first send-off series match ahead of the 2019 FIFA Women's World Cup, defeating South Africa 3–0.

2026 FIFA World Cup

Levi's Stadium is one of 16 venues which will host matches during the 2026 FIFA World Cup. It is one of eleven US venues for the tournament and is also one of two venues in California which will host matches, the other being SoFi Stadium in Los Angeles.

College football
Levi's Stadium has hosted numerous college football games. The first college game played there was an October 2014 regular season game between the Oregon Ducks and the California Golden Bears, in which Oregon won. The stadium was the home of the Redbox Bowl (formerly the Foster Farms Bowl) and it served as the host for the Pac-12 Championship Game from 2014 through 2019. In January 2019, Levi's Stadium hosted the 2019 College Football Playoff National Championship, marking the first time the College Football Playoff title game was played there.

2031 and 2033 Rugby World Cups

The San Francisco Bay Area is amongst the candidates being considered for hosting matches during the 2031 Rugby World Cup and 2033 Women's Rugby World Cup.

Mass vaccination site 

A mass COVID-19 vaccination site opened Tuesday February 9, 2021, at Levi's Stadium, with California Governor Gavin Newsom, representatives of the San Francisco 49ers, and Santa Clara County officials on hand to make it official. Five hundred people received their first dose of a COVID-19 vaccine. The hope is that eventually, 15,000 vaccines will be administered daily.

See also

 Kezar Stadium

References

External links

 
 Levi's Stadium Seating Chart
 Stadiums of Pro Football - 49ers Stadium - San Francisco 49ers

2014 establishments in California
2026 FIFA World Cup Stadiums
American football venues in California
CONCACAF Gold Cup stadiums
National Football League venues
NCAA bowl game venues
Ice hockey venues in California
Levi Strauss & Co.
Olympic football venues
Outdoor ice hockey venues in the United States
San Francisco 49ers stadiums
Sports in Santa Clara, California
Sports venues in Santa Clara County, California
Sports venues completed in 2014
Soccer in the San Francisco Bay Area
Soccer venues in California
Tourist attractions in Santa Clara, California
Venues of the 2028 Summer Olympics
Leadership in Energy and Environmental Design gold certified buildings